The first Alpha Tau Omega fraternity house in Eugene, Oregon is a 2.5-story building in the craftsman style completed in 1910. The wood-frame, hip roof building was constructed by Eugene blacksmith George Lill and features seven varieties of decorative cement blocks applied to the exterior surface. Lill manufactured the blocks himself by a process meant to simulate fine ashlar stone masonry.

Alpha Tau Omega was the fourth fraternity to open at the University of Oregon. The club occupied the house from 1910 to 1922, when a new fraternity house was constructed closer to the university.

The house was placed on the National Register of Historic Places in 1983. The Alpha Tau Omega chapter at the University of Oregon closed in 2000. The fraternity has since reestablished its presence at the University of Oregon by colonizing on February 6, 2015.

See also
 National Register of Historic Places listings in Lane County, Oregon

References

External links
 Alpha Tau Omega official site

Houses on the National Register of Historic Places in Eugene, Oregon
1910 establishments in Oregon
Houses completed in 1910
Fraternity and sorority houses